Karur taluk is a taluk of Karur district of the Indian state of Tamil Nadu. The headquarters of the taluk is the town of Karur

Demographics
According to the 2011 census, the taluk of Karur had a population of 444,721 with 221,107  males and 223,614 females. There were 1011 women for every 1000 men. The taluk had a literacy rate of 74.55. Child population in the age group below 6 was 19,786 Males and 18,295 Females.

References 

Taluks of Karur district